This was a new event in 2013.

Anna-Lena Friedsam and Alison Van Uytvanck won the title, defeating Stéphanie Foretz Gacon and Eva Hrdinová in the final, 6–3, 6–4.

Seeds

Draw

References 
 Draw

Open GDF Suez Seine-et-Marne - Doubles